Fortunato Chelleri (originally: Keller, also: Kelleri, Kellery, Cheler) (May or June 1690 in Parma – 11 December 1757 in Kassel) was a Baroque Kapellmeister and composer.

Biography 
Chelleri's father had emigrated from Germany to Italy; his mother was from the Italian family of musicians Bazzani (or Bassani, see also Giovanni Battista Bassani). After the early death of his parents, he grew up with his uncle Francesco Maria Bazzani in Piacenza, who trained him as a musician. Chelleri started to compose operas for different opera companies in Northern Italy in 1708. He served in noble families in Barcelona, Florence and Venice, among others, including a post as maestro di capella of Anna Maria Luisa de' Medici.

In 1722 Fürstbischof Johann Philipp Franz von Schönborn engaged him as Hofkapellmeister in Würzburg, together with Giovanni Benedetto Platti. After the death of the Fürstbischof in 1724, Chelleri was in Kassel Hofkapellmeister of the Landgraf Karl von Hessen-Kassel. Between 1732 and 1734, he followed Karl's son and successor Frederick of Sweden to the royal court of Stockholm. He returned to Germany with the title and fund of Hofrat (Court Councillor) and directed the private orchestra of Friedrich's brother  Wilhelm VIII, von Hessen-Kassel until his death.

Works 
During his activity in Italy he composed mostly operas, such as L'Innocenza giustificata, premiered in Venice in 1711, La caccia in Etolia, premiered in Ferrara in 1715, on a libretto of Belisario Valeriano which was used by George Frideric Handel for Atalanta, and Amalasunta.

During his time in Germany and Sweden Chelleri composed instrumental and church music, including oratorios in Italian. Compositions for keyboard instruments, such as six Sonate di galanteria (Kassel), and six Sinfonie for strings were published. His oratorio in two parts Beatæ Mariæ Virginis (Würzburg, 1723) was reprinted by Garri Editions, Mühlheim, in 2003.

Selected Recordings 
 Don Quixote (L’attage du moulin, La Doulcinée, La galop de Rosinante, Sanco Panche, Le couche de Don Quixote), organist Kalevi Kiviniemi on the Las Piñas Bamboo Organ in 2003.
 Six Simphonies Nouvelles Orchestra Atalanta Fugiens, dir. Vanni Moretto. Deutsche Harmonia Mundi 2009

Literature 
Arrey von Dommer: Chellery, Fortunato. In: Allgemeine Deutsche Biographie (ADB). Band 4. Duncker & Humblot, Leipzig 1876, p. 114 (in German).
A.Della Cortenel e G.M.Gatti: Dizionario di musica, ed. Paravia & C., Torino, 1956, p. 130 (in Italian)

References

External links 

1690 births
1757 deaths
German male classical composers
Italian conductors (music)
Italian male conductors (music)
German conductors (music)
German male conductors (music)
Italian Baroque composers
German opera composers
Male opera composers
18th-century Italian composers
18th-century German composers
18th-century Italian male musicians